Osula is a village in Võru Parish, Võru County, in southeastern Estonia. As of 2011 Census, the settlement's population was 335.

The Battle of Määritsa was held in Osula village between the Estonian partisans Forest Brothers and Soviet occupation forces on 31 March 1946.

References

Võru Parish
Villages in Võru County
Kreis Werro